is a district of Setagaya, Tokyo, Japan. It is also known as Sancha (三茶) for short.
It is home to many bars, cafes and restaurants. Some major streets include National Route 246, Setagaya-dori and Chazawara-dori.

Education
Setagaya Board of Education operates public elementary and junior high schools.

Sangenjaya 1-chome is zoned to Nakazato Elementary School (中里小学校) and Mishuku Junior High School (三宿中学校). Sangenjaya 2-chome is zoned to Sangenjaya Elementary School (三軒茶屋小学校) and Komazawa Junior High School (駒沢中学校).

References

Districts of Setagaya